Michael McCormack (1943 - 13 January 2002) was an Irish Gaelic footballer who played as a full-back at senior level for the Tipperary county team.

Born in Kilross, County Tipperary, McCormack first played competitive football and hurling during his schooling at Abbey CBS. He arrived on the inter-county scene at the age of seventeen when he first linked up with the Tipperary minor teams as a dual player, before later joining the under-21 football and intermediate and senior hurling teams. He made his senior football debut during the 1965 championship. McCormack went on to play a key role over the next few years, and won one National League (Division 2) medal.

At club level McCormack was a two-time football championship medallist with University College Cork as well as claiming a hurling championship medal with the college. He later won a second hurling championship with St Finbarr's. McCormack began his club career with Aherlow.

His son, Fergal, was an All-Ireland medallist with the Cork hurlers while his brother-in-law, Mick O'Connell, played for Kerry and is regarded as one of the greatest footballers of all-time.

McCormack's retirement came following the conclusion of the 1971 championship.

Honours

Team
Abbey CBS
Dr. Harty Cup (1): 1959

University College Cork
Cork Senior Football Championship (2): 1963, 1964
Cork Senior Hurling Championship (1): 1963
Fitzgibbon Cup (4): 1963, 1964, 1966, 1967
Sigerson Cup (1): 1967

St Finbarr's
Cork Senior Hurling Championship (1): 1968

Tipperary
National League (Division 2) (1): 1970-71

References

1943 births
2002 deaths
Dual players
Aherlow Gaelic footballers
Aherlow hurlers
St Finbarr's Gaelic footballers
St Finbarr's hurlers
UCC hurlers
UCC Gaelic footballers
Tipperary inter-county Gaelic footballers
Tipperary inter-county hurlers